Jennifer Thompson may refer to:

Jennifer Thompson (athlete), New Zealand discus thrower
Jennifer Laura Thompson (born 1969), American stage actress
Jenny Thompson (born 1973), American swimmer
Jennifer Thompson, a critic of the reliability of eyewitness testimony following the exoneration of Ronald Cotton from her rape accusation

See also
Jenny Thompson (disambiguation)
Jennifer Thomson